The 2016 ITTF World Tour was the 21st season of the International Table Tennis Federation's professional table tennis world tour. 2016 also marked the tour's 20th anniversary.

The events of the 2016 tour were split into three tiers: Super Series, Major Series and Challenge Series. The Super Series events offered the highest prize money and the most points towards the ITTF World Tour standings, which determined the qualifiers for the 2016 ITTF World Tour Grand Finals in December. The Major Series was the middle tier, with the Challenge Series being the lowest tier.

Schedule

Below is the schedule released by the ITTF:

Events

Super Series

Winners

Finals
German Open

Kuwait Open

Qatar Open

Japan Open

Korea Open

China Open

Major Series

Winners

Challenge Series

Winners

Standings

Singles
The 15 men and 16 women who played in at least five events and accumulated the largest number of points during the 2016 ITTF World Tour were invited to play in the Grand Finals in December. Qatar's Li Ping was also invited to take part in the men's singles event, to ensure that the host nation was represented.

Men's singles – final standings

Women's singles – final standings

Doubles
The eight men's pairs and eight women's pairs who played in at least four events and accumulated the largest number of points, as a pair, during the 2016 ITTF World Tour were invited to play in the Grand Finals in December.

Men's doubles – final standings

Women's doubles – final standings

Grand Finals

The 2016 ITTF World Tour Grand Finals took place from 8–11 December at the Ali Bin Hamad al-Attiyah Arena in Doha, Qatar.

ITTF Star Awards

The 2016 ITTF Star Awards ceremony was held on the first evening of the Grand Finals at the Sheraton Grand Doha on 8 December.

Awards were handed out in eight categories:

Male Table Tennis Star:  Ma Long
Female Table Tennis Star:  Ding Ning
Male Para Table Tennis Star:  Laurens Devos
Female Para Table Tennis Star:  Liu Jing
Table Tennis Star Coach:  Liu Guoliang
Table Tennis Breakthrough Star:  Miu Hirano
Table Tennis Star Point:  Fan Zhendong at the 2016 Japan Open
Fair Play Star:  Rinad Fathy

See also
2016 World Team Table Tennis Championships
Table tennis at the 2016 Summer Olympics

References

External links
International Table Tennis Federation

2016 in table tennis
ITTF World Tour